NGC 670 is a lenticular galaxy located in the Triangulum constellation about 165 million light years from the Milky Way. It was discovered by the German-British astronomer William Herschel in 1786.

See also 
 List of NGC objects (1–1000)

References

External links 
 

Triangulum (constellation)
670
Lenticular galaxies
006570